The 1997 CAF Cup was the sixth football club tournament season that took place for the runners-up of each African country's domestic league. It was won by ES Tunis in two-legged final victory against Petro Atlético.

Preliminary round

|}

Notes
1 Dragons de l'Ouémé disqualified for not having submitted players' licenses in time.

First round

|}

Notes
1 Mighty Barrolle disqualified for not having submitted players' licenses in time.

Second round

|}

Notes
1 Played as one leg in Uganda due to the civil war in Zaire (afterwards called Democratic Republic of the Congo).

Quarter-finals

|}

Semi-finals

|}

Final

|}

Winners

External links
CAF Cup 1997 - rsssf.com

3
1997